Little Theatre in the Adelphi was a theatre in London, on what is now John Adam Street just west of the Royal Society of Arts. It should not be confused with either the Haymarket Theatre (also known as the Little Theatre) or the Adelphi Theatre both of which are in the West End. The theatre was constructed in 1910 from a banking hall previously used by Messrs Coutts, part of the original Adam Brothers Adelphi development between the Strand and the River Thames.

The first lessee of the Little Theatre was the actor-manager Gertrude Kingston, who had it built largely to her specification, making it the first British theatre to adopt certain lighting techniques, including ‘dimmer’ lights, which had been invented in the United States. From 1932 to 1941 it was the permanent home of the People's National Theatre with its manager Nancy Price. The theatre was twice bombed, once in 1917, being reconstructed on its original lines in 1920, and again in 1941. It was demolished in 1949.

The first play staged after its 1920 reopening was Edward Knoblock's Mumsie.

References

External links
1937 survey of John Adam Street
Map showing theatre

Former buildings and structures in the City of Westminster
Former theatres in London
1910 establishments in England
1941 disestablishments in England
Theatres completed in 1910